Ron Watson may refer to:
 Ron Watson (rugby league), Australian rugby league player
 Ron Watson (sailor) (born 1937), New Zealand sailor
 Ron Watson (politician), American politician in the Maryland House of Delegates